The 33rd annual Berlin International Film Festival was held from 18 February to 1 March 1983. The festival opened with the out of competition film, Tootsie by Sydney Pollack.

The Golden Bear was awarded to the British film Ascendancy directed by Edward Bennett and Spanish film La colmena directed by Mario Camus. The retrospective titled Exile. Six Actors from Germany was dedicated to German or Austrian actors Wolfgang Zilzer, Curt Bois, Dolly Haas, Francis Lederer, Elisabeth Bergner and Hertha Thiele, who were forced to leave Germany after the 1930s rise of the Nazi regime.

Jury

The following people were announced as being on the jury for the festival:
 Jeanne Moreau, actress (France) - Jury President
 Alex Bänninger, publicist and writer (Switzerland)
 Franco Brusati, playwright, director and screenwriter (Italy)
 Elem Klimov, director (Soviet Union)
 , actress (West Germany)
 Kurt Maetzig, director and screenwriter (East Germany)
 Joseph L. Mankiewicz, director, screenwriter and producer (United States)
 Franz Seitz, director, screenwriter and producer (West Germany)
 Huang Zongjiang, writer (China)

Films in competition
The following films were in competition for the Golden Bear:

Out of competition
 De vlaschaard, directed by Jan Gruyaert (Belgium, Netherlands)
 Echtzeit, directed by Hellmuth Costard and Jürgen Ebert (West Germany)
 Das Gespenst, directed by Herbert Achternbusch (West Germany)
 In the King of Prussia, directed by Emile de Antonio (USA)
 , directed by Peter Stein (West Germany)
 Koyaanisqatsi, directed by Godfrey Reggio (USA)
 War and Peace, directed by Stefan Aust, Axel Engstfeld, Alexander Kluge and Volker Schlöndorff (West Germany)
 Sans Soleil, directed by Chris Marker (France)
 Tootsie, directed by Sydney Pollack (USA)

Key
{| class="wikitable"
| style="background:#FFDEAD;" align="center"| †
|Winner of the main award for best film in its section
|-
| colspan="2"| The opening and closing films are screened during the opening and closing ceremonies respectively.
|}

Retrospective

The following films were shown in the retrospective "Exile. Six Actors from Germany":

Awards

The following prizes were awarded by the Jury:
 Golden Bear:
 Ascendancy by Edward Bennett
 La colmena by Mario Camus
 Silver Bear – Special Jury Prize: Hakkâri'de Bir Mevsim by Erden Kıral
 Silver Bear for Best Director: Éric Rohmer for Pauline à la plage
 Silver Bear for Best Actress: Yevgeniya Glushenko for Vlyublyon po sobstvennomu zhelaniyu
 Silver Bear for Best Actor: Bruce Dern for That Championship Season
 Silver Bear for an outstanding single achievement: Xaver Schwarzenberger for Der stille Ozean
 Honourable Mention:
 Mo sheng de peng you by Lei Xu
 Der er et yndigt land by Morten Arnfred
 Dies rigorose Leben by Vadim Glowna
FIPRESCI Award
Pauline à la plage by Éric Rohmer and Hakkâri'de Bir Mevsim by Erden Kıral

References

External links
33rd Berlin International Film Festival 1983
1983 Berlin International Film Festival
Berlin International Film Festival:1983 at Internet Movie Database

33
1983 film festivals
1983 in West Germany
1980s in West Berlin
Berlin